Aglaia simplicifolia is a species of plant in the family Meliaceae. It is found in Brunei, India, Indonesia, Laos, Malaysia, and Thailand.

References

simplicifolia
Near threatened plants
Taxonomy articles created by Polbot